Choi Chul-kwon (born 19 July 1963) is a South Korean basketball player. He competed in the men's tournament at the 1988 Summer Olympics.

References

1963 births
Living people
South Korean men's basketball players
Olympic basketball players of South Korea
Basketball players at the 1988 Summer Olympics
Basketball players from Seoul